

Paleozoic New Brunswick

 Forest Hills Formation
 Hanford Brook Formation
 St. John Group
 Wades Lane Formation
 Avalonia
 Northern Appalachians Seismic Zone
 Bathurst Mining Camp
 Mount Carleton Provincial Park
 Coastal Volcanic Belt
 Fundy Basin
 Chignecto Basin
 Mount Pleasant Caldera
 Sugarloaf Mountain
 Back Bay Formation
 Limestone Point Formation
 Petit Rocher Formation
 Campbellton Formation
 Dalhousie Group
 La Garde Formation
 Leda Clay Formation
 Maritime Plain

Mesozoic New Brunswick

stub

References

Bibliography
 
 
 
 
 
 
 
 
 
 

 
History of New Brunswick
Natural history of New Brunswick
Appalachian Mountains
Ordovician Canada
Cenozoic Canada